Gemmula amabilis is a species of sea snail, a marine gastropod mollusk in the family Turridae, the turrids.

Description
The length of the shell attains 40 mm.

The pale yellowish-brown, fusiform shell is rather solid. It is spirally girdled with sutures sculpted with incremental striae. The first cingulum (the spiral ornamentation) is distinctly nodose. The carina (the keel-like structure) is produced, covered with white nodules. The conical spire has an acute apex and shows eleven carinated whorls. The evanescent suture is oblique; the last one is convex. The siphonal canal is narrow and long. The aperture is pear-shaped. It is marginally and internally ribbed. The outer lip is produced below.

Distribution
This species occurs in the Red Sea and the Gulf of Aden.

References

External links
 Gastropods.com: Gemmula (Gemmula) amabilis
  Tucker, J.K. 2004 Catalog of recent and fossil turrids (Mollusca: Gastropoda). Zootaxa 682:1-1295.

amabilis